Hemiandra pungens, commonly known as snakebush, is a shrub or trailing plant that is endemic to southwestern Western Australia.

Description
Ranging in height from 5 cm to 100 cm, it occurs on rock outcrops. It is a variable species that may form a trailing plant or a small shrub. The spotted flowers may be white, pink or bluish-purple and appear throughout the year. It flowers in the spring.

Taxonomy
The species was formally described in 1810 by Scottish botanist Robert Brown.

A widely cultivated variety lacking hairs on the stems and leaves is sometimes classified as a variety (Hemiandra pungens var. glabra), or by some authors as Hemiandra glabra, or treated as a synonym of Hemiandra pungens.

Cultivation
H. pungens seed is not typically available but this species is easily propagated from cuttings of other plants. It can be grafted onto related species including Westringia fruticosa. It can be grown in containers such as hanging baskets, and it performs best in dry climates without humid summers, in a sunny, well-drained area.

References

Eudicots of Western Australia
Lamiaceae
Lamiales of Australia
Plants described in 1810